This article lists all rugby league footballers who have played first-grade for the New Zealand Warriors in the National Rugby League.

Notes:
 Debut:
 Players are listed in the order of their debut game with the club.
 Players that debuted in the same game are added alphabetically.
 Appearances: New Zealand Warriors games only, not a total of their career games. For example, Nathan Fien has played a career total of 276 first-grade games, but of those 105 were at the Warriors.
 Previous Club: refers to the previous first-grade rugby league club (NRL or Super League) the player played at and does not refer to any junior club, rugby union club or a rugby league club he/she was signed to but never played at.
 The statistics in this table are correct as of round 2 of the 2023 NRL season.

List of Players

Men

Women

Key
 An asterisk (*) next to a name denotes that the player had more than one spell at the club.
 A cross (†) next to a name denotes that the player played in the 1997 World Club Championship. These games are not included in the above statistics.

References

External links
 NZLeague.co.nz
 Rugby League in New Zealand
 Matthew's Unofficial Warriors Page
 Official Warriors Site
 2000 World Cup
 International Squads 1997
 NRL Stats Rleague History, Sportsdata. Date accessed 4 October 2008.
 Rugby League Tables / New Zealand Scorers, Rugby League Tables & Statistics. Date accessed 4 October 2008.

Warriors players
 
National Rugby League lists